Berrueco is a small village, overlooking the Laguna de Gallocanta in Zaragoza province, Spain, about 90 km southwest of Zaragoza.

Evidence of the Celt-Iberian settlement that predates the village is visible to the south of the village.

References 

Municipalities in the Province of Zaragoza